Otto Paul James Kelland (born 1933) is a former politician in Newfoundland. He represented Naskaupi in the Newfoundland House of Assembly from 1985 to 1992.

The son of Otto Kelland, he was born in St. John's and was educated at Bishop Feild College and at St. John's Vocational Institute. Kelland worked in telecommunications as a radio operator and administrator. After amalgamation created the town of Happy Valley-Goose Bay, he became its first mayor in 1974.

Kelland was elected to the Newfoundland assembly in 1985 and was reelected in 1989. He was named to the provincial cabinet as Minister of the Environment and Minister responsible for Wildlife and Parks. He resigned from cabinet in June 1991. Kelland resigned his seat in the assembly on May 28, 1992.

References 

1933 births
Living people
Liberal Party of Newfoundland and Labrador MHAs
Mayors of places in Newfoundland and Labrador
Members of the Executive Council of Newfoundland and Labrador
Politicians from St. John's, Newfoundland and Labrador